In linear algebra, the generalized singular value decomposition (GSVD) is the name of two different techniques based on the singular value decomposition (SVD). The two versions differ because one version decomposes two matrices (somewhat like the higher-order or tensor SVD) and the other version uses a set of constraints imposed on the left and right singular vectors of a single-matrix SVD.

First version: two-matrix decomposition
The generalized singular value decomposition (GSVD) is a matrix decomposition on a pair of matrices which generalizes the singular value decomposition. It was introduced by Van Loan  in 1976 and later developed by Paige and Saunders, which is the version described here. In contrast to the SVD, the GSVD decomposes simultaneously a pair of matrices with the same number of columns. The SVD and the GSVD, as well as some other possible generalizations of the SVD, are extensively used in the study of the conditioning and regularization of linear systems with respect to quadratic semi-norms.

Definition  

The generalized singular value decomposition of matrices  and  iswhere
  is unitary, 
  is unitary, 
  is unitary,
is unitary,
 ,
 ,
 ,
 ,
 .

While  is diagonal,  is not always diagonal, because of the leading rectangular zero matrix; instead  is "bottom-right-diagonal".

Variations 

There are many variations of the GSVD. These variations are related to the fact that it is always possible to multiply  from the left by  where  is an arbitrary unitary matrix. We denote 

  
Such matrices exist by RQ-decomposition.
 . Then  is invertible. 

Here are some variations of the GSVD: 

 MATLAB (gsvd): 
 LAPACK (LA_GGSVD): 
 Simplified:

Generalized singular values 

We have 

By these properties we can show that the generalized singular values are exactly the pairs . We haveTherefore

In, the generalized singular values are claimed to be those which solve .

Generalized inverse 

Since it does not in general satisfy , this is not the Moore–Penrose inverse; otherwise we could derive  for any choice of matrices, which only holds for certain class of matrices. 

This generalized inverse has the following properties:

Quotient SVD 

By the above properties, . Note that  is diagonal, and that, ignoring the leading zeros, contains the singular ratios in decreasing order. Hence the sometimes used name "quotient SVD", although this is not the only reason for using GSVD. If  is not invertible, then is still the SVD of  if we relax the requirement of having the singular values in decreasing order. Since rank equals the number of non-zero singular values, .

Construction 
Let 

ThenWe also haveThereforeSince  has orthonormal columns, . ThereforeWe also have for each  such that  thatTherefore , and

Applications 

The GSVD, formulated as a comparative spectral decomposition, has been successfully applied to signal processing and data science, e.g., in genomic signal processing.

These applications inspired several additional comparative spectral decompositions, i.e., the higher-order GSVD (HO GSVD) and the tensor GSVD.

Second version: weighted single-matrix decomposition
The weighted version of the generalized singular value decomposition (GSVD) is a constrained matrix decomposition with constraints imposed on the left and right singular vectors of the singular value decomposition. This form of the GSVD is an extension of the SVD as such. Given the SVD of an m×n real or complex matrix M

where

This form of the GSVD is the core of certain techniques, such as generalized principal component analysis and Correspondence analysis.

The weighted form of the GSVD is called as such because, with the correct selection of weights, it generalizes many techniques (such as multidimensional scaling and linear discriminant analysis)

References

Further reading 

 
 LAPACK manual 

Linear algebra
Singular value decomposition